Papyrus Oxyrhynchus 230 (P. Oxy. 230 or P. Oxy. II 230) is a fragment of the De Corona by Demosthenes, written in Greek. It was discovered in Oxyrhynchus. The manuscript was written on papyrus in the form of a roll. It is dated to the second century. Currently, it is housed in the Milton S. Eisenhower Library of the Johns Hopkins University in Baltimore.

Description 
The document was written by an unknown copyist. It contains part of the text of the De Corona (40-47) by Demosthenes. The measurements of the fragment are 280 by 210 mm. The text is written in a round, rather irregular uncial hand. It occasionally differs from the ordinary text. Only a few corrections were made by a second hand, which is also responsible for some rough breathings. Grenfell and Hunt collated the text of the manuscript against the text of De Corona from Dindorf-Blass's edition.

It was discovered by Grenfell and Hunt in 1897 in Oxyrhynchus. The text was published by Grenfell and Hunt in 1899.

See also 
 Oxyrhynchus Papyri
 Papyrus Oxyrhynchus 25
 Papyrus Oxyrhynchus 229
 Papyrus Oxyrhynchus 231

References 

230
2nd-century manuscripts